Tiorati Brook Road is a scenic road located within Harriman State Park in southern New York in the United States. The road crosses over the county line roughly midway between the two locations. Tiorati Brook Road is owned and maintained by the Palisades Interstate Park Commission.

The road, once known as Cedar Ponds Road, was first spotted in a map of Rockland County by David Barr in 1839. The route was taken over by the county of Rockland in 1899 until 1915, when the Palisades Park Interstate Commission took over the highway. The group paved the rugged route through Harriman State Park with gravel in 1915, widening it a year later. In 1931, the route was paved from Tiorati Circle to NY 210 (now County Route 106). Since 1931, the route has been truncated twice: once for construction of the Palisades Interstate Parkway and later for the construction of Lake Welch Parkway.

Route description

Tiorati Brook Road begins at Tiorati Circle, a traffic circle at the north end of Lake Tiorati in Harriman State Park. Here, the road connects to Seven Lakes Drive and the eastern terminus of Arden Valley Road. The highway heads southeast from the junction, running along the northeastern edge of Lake Tiorati as it passes by the dense forests that comprise most of Harriman State Park. After , the highway serves the Tiorati Workshop, a collaboration between the State Park and Bank Street College of Education, located adjacent to the eastern lake shore. Past the workshop, the road takes on a more southerly routing and descends down a hill before crossing Tiorati Brook by way of a dam. Just south of the dam is Day Camp in the Park, where Tiorati Brook Road turns back to the east to follow its namesake waterway away from the lake.

For the next , the highway meanders southeastward across the park's sprawling forests, intersecting no other roads of note. During this stretch, the road passes from Orange County to Rockland County. It eventually ends at a wye interchange with Lake Welch Parkway, where the road merges into the northbound direction of the parkway. The southbound connection is made by way of a northbound to southbound U-turn a short distance to the east. The interchange lies just west of Lake Welch Parkway's northern terminus at Palisades Interstate Parkway exit 16, a partial interchange lacking a connection between Lake Welch Parkway northbound and Palisades Parkway northbound.

History
The roadway that would later become Tiorati Brook Road dates back to records from a map of Rockland County in 1839 by David Barr. Known as the Cedar Ponds Road, the road was acquired by the county in 1899, and in 1907, when a report to the county was made, the route was in really poor condition for their roads. Topographical maps dating as far back as 1910 show Tiorati Brook Road as a local road reaching as far east as what is today the intersection of Gate Hill Road (Rockland CR 106) and Cedar Falls Road (CR 69), east of the Palisades Interstate Parkway.

In May 1915, the Palisades Interstate Park Commission took over maintenance of the road, which ran from the dam at Cedar Ponds to the village of Stony Point. Fifteen years later, the Commission paved the roadway with asphalt from Tiorati Circle to the junction with NY 210 (designated the prior year, now CR-106). In 1953, construction of the Palisades Interstate Parkway caused the road to be truncated in a local section called Pingyp.

Major intersections

References

External links 

Harriman State Park (New York)
Transportation in Orange County, New York
Transportation in Rockland County, New York
Parkways in New York (state)